The Palmer Hay Flats State Game Refuge is located in Alaska, south of Wasilla and north of Anchorage. In springtime, tens of thousands of migratory geese, swans, shoebirds, and ducks rest and refuel. Many of these stay in the summer. The Knik River, the Matanuska River, Rabbit Slough, Wasilla Creek, Cottonwood Creek, and Spring Creek flow through it.

It is a popular location for hunting, skiing, iceskating, and hiking, and other uses.  It is bisected by the Glenn Highway.

It can be accessed at Rabbit Slough, from the Glenn Highway, Nelson Road, Scout Ridge and other locations.

History 
An indigenous people called the Knikatnu first settled the land that would become the Palmer Hay Flats State Game Refuge before Alaskan annexation into the United States. The indigenous people left behind a trail that would become the Iditarod Trail. Prior to the 1964 Alaska earthquake, the land was dry grassland. The name of the refuge stems from the hay farming that went on before the earthquake.

References

External links
 U.S. Geological Survey Map at the U.S. Geological Survey Map Website. Retrieved January 15, 2023.

Protected areas of Matanuska-Susitna Borough, Alaska